The University of San Francisco School of Nursing and Health Professions (SNAHP) is the nursing school of the private University of San Francisco, located in San Francisco, California. First established in 1954, the school has approximately 1,300 students.

History
Founded by the Sisters of Mercy in 1954.

Campus
The school is located in Cowell Hall on the  hilltop USF campus overlooking Golden Gate Park, the Pacific Ocean and downtown San Francisco.  Cowell Hall is located on the main campus, entrance from Golden Gate Avenue between Kittredge Terrace and Roselyn Terrace; Cowell Hall is behind the Harney Science Center and the University Center.

The school works in conjunction with many of the hospitals in the San Francisco Bay Area to provide clinical training for students.

There is a learning resource center and skills laboratory on the first floor of Cowell Hall which provides an environment in which students can practice their skills and clinical decision making. There is also a state of the art simulation center located on the main campus. The simulation center provides opportunities for students to work in teams to acquire clinical judgment and develop in the professional nursing role.

Beyond the San Francisco campus, the school offers master's-level programs at USF's regional campuses in Pleasanton, Sacramento, San Jose, and Santa Rosa.  Additionally, graduate courses are offered at a location in the Presidio and in Orange.

Academics
The school has over 1,300 students enrolled in nine degree programs.  Each degree incorporates the Jesuit mission and values with program outcomes focused on working with underserved populations.

Undergraduate degrees

The school offers a BSN program leading to licensure as a registered nurse (RN). The Bachelor of Health Services (BHS) degree is intended to prepare students for healthcare administration and management. In 2016, one of its graduates, Connor Marston, had the top score for grades, physical fitness and nursing skills for all Army ROTC graduates in the United States.

Postgraduate degrees
The Master of Science in Nursing for Non-Nurses (MSN for Non-Nurses) program is designed for students who hold bachelor's degrees in areas of study outside of nursing and are seeking new careers as registered nurses. Conversely, the Master of Science in Nursing for Registered Nurses is the pathway of the MSN program that prepares RNs already holding an associate's or bachelor's degree in nursing to advance within the field. The MSN degree has a Clinical Nurse Leader (CNL) focus.  The MSN program for Registered Nurses is available to students online.

The school also offers a Master of Public Health (MPH) program, a Master of Science in Behavioral Health (MSBH), a two-year Master of Science in Healthcare Simulation (MSIM), and a Master of Science in Health Informatics (MSHI).  The Master of Public Health and Master of Science in Healthcare Simulation is currently offered online.  As of January 2016, Graduate Certificates are available that include Executive Certificate in Clinical Informatics and Certificate in Healthcare Simulation Education.

A Transition to Practice Program is also available for RNs who are recent graduates with no prior work experience.  Blended programs that allow students to simultaneously work on their master's degree while earning their bachelor's are also available with various programs which include: MPH, MSHI, MSBH or MSN.

The Doctor of Nursing Practice (DNP) is a practice-focused doctorate. Graduates are prepared as nurse practitioners (direct advanced practice),  psychiatric and mental health nurse practitioners or healthcare system leaders (indirect advanced practice). Nurses with either the BSN or those who have already earned the MSN can pursue the degree.  An executive leader DNP (ELDNP) program is available for nursing executives to complete their study in healthcare system leadership.  The Doctor of Psychology (PsyD) prepares graduates to work as psychologists, with a focus on practice in lieu of research.

Admissions
The School has a different start term for each program based on campus location. It is important to check with the Office of Undergraduate or Graduate Admission for specific start terms and application deadlines for each program.  If you have questions regarding the admissions process, start term, or campus location, you should contact the Admission Office.

Student life
In addition to the USF's student life that engages students across all fields of study, the School of Nursing and Health Professions has various student organizations which provide both graduates and undergraduates with opportunities to become involved in school matters, university life, state- and nationwide professional organizations and community service unique to students studying in the School of Nursing and Health Professions which include: Nursing Student Association (NSA), Sigma Theta Tau International Honor Society of Nursing: Beta Gamma Chapter, Tri Gamma Nursing Society, MSNS (Previously Male Student Nursing Society), Nursing Student Multicultural Interest Group and Masters in Public Health Student Association (MPHSA).  Networking and mentorship programs are also available for students both undergraduate and graduate that connect them with alumni, faculty and members of the wider community.  Students also have the opportunity to participate in immersion programs that focus on nursing and healthcare in the Central Valley of California, South Korea, Mexico, Cuba, Guatemala and Colombia.

Miscellaneous
The School is accredited by the California Board of Registered Nursing and by the Commission on Collegiate Nursing Education (CCNE).

The USF School of Nursing and Health Professions has a 96% passing rate on the NCLEX among its baccalaureate students and a 100% passing rate for the masters-entry level students.

Student nurses from USF provide 140,000 hours of health care services to the San Francisco Bay Area each year.

See also

List of nursing schools in the United States

References

External links

University of San Francisco
Nursing schools in California
Educational institutions established in 1954
1954 establishments in California